Crooked Shadows is the seventh studio album by American rock band Dashboard Confessional. It was released on February 9, 2018 through Fueled by Ramen and Dine Alone Records. It is their first studio album in nine years, following 2009's Alter the Ending.

The album debuted at number 53 on the Billboard 200, as well as number four on both the Billboard Rock Albums and Alternative Albums charts.

Release
On November 15, 2017, "We Fight" premiered on Beats 1. Alongside this, Crooked Shadows was announced for release in February the following year. On December 18, a music video was released for "Belong", directed by Joe Zohar. Two days later, a music video was released for "We Fight", directed by David Mack. In early January 2018, the band performed the track on Conan. On January 19, "Heart Beat Here" was made available for streaming. Crooked Shadows was released on February 9 through Fueled by Ramen.

In February and March 2018, the group embarked on a headlining US tour with support from Beach Slang. In August, they went on a co-headlining US tour with All Time Low. A second leg was planned to follow in September and October, however, the day before this was to start, the band pulled out of a few days due to Carrabba dealing with a family emergency. Four days later, the group pulled out of the second leg entirely. On November 15, a music video was released for "Just What to Say", directed by Ryan Hamblin.

Critical reception

Crooked Shadows was met with "mixed or average" reviews from critics. At Metacritic, which assigns a weighted average rating out of 100 to reviews from mainstream publications, this release received an average score of 57, based on 9 reviews. Aggregator Album of the Year gave the album 60 out of 100 based on a critical consensus of 9 reviews.

Track listing

Personnel
Chris Carrabba - lead vocals, guitar, keyboard

Armon Jay - guitar, backing vocals

Scott Schoenbeck - bass, keyboard

Chris Kamrada - drums, percussion

Charts

References

Dashboard Confessional albums
2018 albums
Fueled by Ramen albums